is a Japanese former football player.

Career
On 4 January 2023, Jinushizono announcement officially retirement from football after 12 years career at professional.

Club statistics
Updated to 20 February 2015.

References

External links
Profile at FC Maruyasu Okazaki

1989 births
Living people
Tokai Gakuen University alumni
Association football people from Kagoshima Prefecture
Japanese footballers
J2 League players
Japan Football League players
FC Gifu players
FC Maruyasu Okazaki players
Association football midfielders